XHCRG-FM is a radio station on 102.9 FM in Ciudad Camargo, Chihuahua. The station is owned by Radiza and known as Super FM 102.9.

History
XHCRG received its concession on March 14, 1997, and signed on January 5, 1998. The concession was originally awarded to Carlos de Jesús Aguirre Gómez, part of the Aguirre Gómez family that owns Grupo Radio Centro and Grupo Radio México.

References

Radio stations in Chihuahua